Garh Kamalpur is a census town in Mahishadal CD block in Haldia subdivision of Purba Medinipur district in the state of West Bengal, India.

Geography

Location

Urbanisation
79.19% of the population of Haldia subdivision live in the rural areas. Only 20.81% of the population live in the urban areas, and that is the highest proportion of urban population amongst the four subdivisions in Purba Medinipur district.

Note: The map alongside presents some of the notable locations in the subdivision. All places marked in the map are linked in the larger full screen map.

Demographics
As per 2011 Census of India Garh Kamalpur had a total population of 6,664 of which 3,368 (51%) were males and 3,296 (49%) were females. Population below 6 years was 639. The total number of literates in Garh Kamalpur was 5,406 (89.73% of the population over 6 years).

Infrastructure
As per the District Census Handbook 2011, Garh Kamalpur covered an area of 1.6341 km2. It had the facility of both a railway station and bus routes at Mahishadal nearby. Amongst the civic amenities it had 615 domestic electric connections. Amongst the medical facilities it had a hospital nearby and 22 medicine shops in the town. Amongst the educational facilities it had were 4 primary schools, 2 middle schools, 2 secondary school, 2 senior secondary schools and a degree college. Amongst the recreational and cultural facilities a cinema theatre, an auditorium/ community hall, a public library and a reading room were there in the town.

Transport
Garh Kamalpur is on the Haldia-Tamluk-Mecheda Road. Mahishadal railway station and Satish Samanta Halt railway station is located nearby.

Education
Mahishadal Raj College at Garh Kamalpur was established in 1946. In addition to courses in arts, science and commerce, it offers post-graduate courses in Bengali and chemistry.

Healthcare
Basulia Rural Hospital, the main medical facility in Mahishadal CD block, is located nearby.

References

Cities and towns in Purba Medinipur district